The 1973 Virginia Slims of Fort Lauderdale, also known as the S&H Green Stamp Tennis Classic,  was a women's tennis tournament played on outdoor clay courts in Fort Lauderdale, Florida in the United States that was part of the 1973 Women's Grand Prix Circuit (A class). It was the third edition of the tournament and was held from February 26 through March 4, 1973. First-seeded Chris Evert won the singles title.

Finals

Singles
 Chris Evert defeated  Virginia Wade 6–1, 6–2

Doubles
 Gail Sherriff /  Virginia Wade defeated  Evonne Goolagong /  Janet Young 4–6, 6–3, 6–2

See also
 Virginia Slims of Fort Lauderdale

References

Virginia Slims of Fort Lauderdale